Claverdon railway station serves the village of Claverdon in Warwickshire, England. It is managed by West Midlands Railway, although most of the services from the station are operated by Chiltern Railways. It is a request stop for West Midlands Railway services that call at the station, but a regular stop for Chiltern Railways services.

The line on which the station stands was opened by the Stratford on Avon Railway as a single-track branch in 1860, but was doubled between Bearley and Hatton in 1938 and a new two-platform station was built at Claverdon. When the second track was lifted in 1969 Claverdon reverted to being a single-platform station.

Services
The station sees six Chiltern Railways departures in each direction on the Leamington–Stratford line every day except Sundays, some of these trains continue to or start from London Marylebone. Three West Midlands Trains stop at the station per day upon request on weekdays only (one northbound service to Stourbridge Junction in the morning and two southbound services to Stratford-upon-Avon in the evening), but most pass through without stopping. On Saturdays, one northbound West Midlands Trains service stops at the station upon request.

References

External links

Historical photographs of Claverdon station at warwickshirerailways.com
Rail Around Birmingham and the West Midlands: Claverdon station

Railway stations in Warwickshire
DfT Category F2 stations
Former Great Western Railway stations
Railway stations in Great Britain opened in 1860
Railway stations served by Chiltern Railways
Railway stations served by West Midlands Trains
Railway request stops in Great Britain